Joseph Powell Mercer (21 July 1889 – 1927) was an English professional footballer who made 150 appearances in the Football League for Nottingham Forest as a centre half. He was the father of footballer and manager Joe Mercer.

Personal life 
Mercer worked as a bricklayer before and during his professional football career. He married Ethel Breeze in June 1913 and had four children, the oldest being future footballer and manager Joe Mercer. On 16 December 1914, four months since the outbreak of the First World War, Mercer enlisted in the Football Battalion of the Middlesex Regiment on the day the battalion was established. He and was posted to the front on 17 October 1915. At the front, Mercer was promoted to sergeant, sustained wounds to the head, leg and shoulder and was captured by the Germans in Oppy on 28 April 1917. He was held in camps at Douai, Bad Langensalza, Giessen and Meschede and returned home in January 1919. In the post-war years, Mercer attempted to resume his football career and continued working as a bricklayer before dying in 1927 of health problems caused by gas inhalation in the trenches a decade earlier.

Career statistics

References

1889 births
1927 deaths
People from Bebington
English footballers
Association football midfielders
Ellesmere Port Town F.C. players
Nottingham Forest F.C. players
Tranmere Rovers F.C. players
Military personnel from Cheshire
English Football League players
British Army personnel of World War I
Middlesex Regiment soldiers
World War I prisoners of war held by Germany
British bricklayers
British World War I prisoners of war
British military personnel killed in World War I